Jamie Hunter (born 21 March 1987 in Scotland) is a former Scotland 7s international rugby union footballer who played for Glasgow Warriors. He played at Scrum half.

Rugby union career

Amateur career

Hunter played for Hillhead Jordanhill before moving on to Glasgow Hawks. He then played for West of Scotland.

Later Hunter played for Ayr.

Professional career

Hunter had played for Glasgow U18s.

Hunter was an Elite Development Player for Glasgow Warriors in season 2007-08.

International career

Hunter has played for Scotland U18, Scotland U19 and Scotland U20

He was in the Scotland 7s squad for the IRB World Series 7s tournaments in Wellington (1 and 2 February) and San Diego (9 and 10 February) in 2008.

References

External links
Scots off to Hong Kong flier
Scots choose sevens series hopes
Hunter In For Anderson
Glasgow Ticket To The Max

1987 births
Living people
Scottish rugby union players
Glasgow Warriors players
Glasgow Hawks players
West of Scotland FC players
Scotland international rugby sevens players
Ayr RFC players
Hillhead Jordanhill players
Male rugby sevens players
Rugby union players from Glasgow